The Roman Road of Ankara or Cardo Maximus is an ancient Roman road in Ankara, the capital of Turkey. The road was found in 1995 by Turkish archaeologist Cevdet Bayburtluoğlu. Many ancient artifacts were discovered during the excavations along the road and most of them are currently displayed at the Museum of Anatolian Civilizations.

See also 
 Roman roads

References 

Roman roads in Turkey
History of Ankara
Transport in Ankara
Tourist attractions in Ankara